Patrick Fitzsimons (died 13 June 1982) was an Irish politician. He was an independent member of Seanad Éireann from 1948 to 1954 and from 1957 to 1973. He was first elected to the Seanad in 1948 by the Administrative Panel. He lost his seat at the 1954 election but was re-elected at the 1957 election. He did not contest the 1973 Seanad election.

References

Year of birth missing
1982 deaths
Independent members of Seanad Éireann
Members of the 6th Seanad
Members of the 7th Seanad
Members of the 9th Seanad
Members of the 10th Seanad
Members of the 11th Seanad
Members of the 12th Seanad